The 1956 Buddy Shuman 250 was a NASCAR Grand National Series event that was held on November 11, 1956, at Hickory Speedway in Hickory, North Carolina.

Background
Hickory Motor Speedway is a short track located in Hickory, North Carolina.  It is one of stock car racing's most storied venues, and is often referred to as the "World's Most Famous Short Track" and the "Birthplace of the NASCAR Stars".

The track first opened in 1951 as a  dirt track.  Gwyn Staley won the first race at the speedway and later became the first track champion.  Drivers such as Junior Johnson, Ned Jarrett, and Ralph Earnhardt also became track champions in the 1950s, with Earnhardt  winning five of them.

In 1953, NASCAR's Grand National Series visited the track for the first time.  Tim Flock won the first race at the speedway, which became a regular part of the Grand National schedule.  After winning his track championship in 1952, Junior Johnson became the most successful Grand National driver at Hickory, winning there seven times.

The track has been re-configured three times in its history.  The track became a 0.4-mile (644 meters) dirt track in 1955, which was paved for the first time during the 1967 season.

Race report
The race took one hour and thirty minutes to successfully conclude with Speedy Thompson defeating Earnhardt by four seconds in front of 3500 live spectators. All 22 racers on the starting grid were American-born males.

Other notable racers of the era like Tiny Lund, Lee Petty, and Buck Baker would make an appearance during this race. Billy Carden would be credited for making the race's last-place finish with a clutch problem on lap 9. DePaolo Engineering would sponsor four of the drivers in the race (Earnhardt, Ralph Moody, Bill Amick, and Carden). This would be the last NASCAR race for Junior Johnson before he went to jail for 11 months for his illegal moonshine activities.

The combined prize purse for this race was $4,285; with the winner (Speedy Thompson) taking home $850 ($ when adjusted for inflation) while Pete Yow would be the 20th-place finisher bringing home a meager $50 ($ when adjusted for inflation). Blackie Pitt and Billy Carden both failed to make a paycheck during this race; causing them to lose money for their hard efforts.

Carl Kiekhaefer was the only notable crew chief on attendance for this race.

By the 1990s, NASCAR's top-level series became a media circus that only races at facilities that are worth hundreds of millions of dollars.

Qualifying

Finishing order
Section reference:

 Speedy Thompson† (No. 300)
 Ralph Earnhardt† (No. 22)
 Buck Baker† (No. 300B)
 Ralph Moody† (No. 12)
 Doug Cox (No. 86)
 Bill Amick† (No. 97)
 Tiny Lund† (No.16)
 Johnny Dodson (No. 83)
 Bill Champion† (No. 31)
 Bill Blair† (No. 75)
 Lee Petty*† (No.42)
 Pete Stewart (No. 209)
 George Green (No. 418)
 Johnny Allen (No. 64)
 Junior Johnson* (No. 2)
 Brownie King (No. 60)
 Bobby Keck*† (No. 96)
 Jack Smith*† (No. 500)
 Bobby Myers*† (No. 4)
 Pete Yow* (No. 203)
 Blackie Pitt*† (No. 59)
 Billy Carden*† (No. 297)

† signifies that the driver is known to be deceased 
* Driver failed to finish race

Timeline
Section reference:
 Start of race: Buck Baker starts off the race in the pole position.
 Lap 9: Billy Carden's faulty vehicle clutch would render him the last-place finisher for this event.
 Lap 39: Junior Johnson takes over the lead from Buck Baker.
 Lap 63: Blackie Pett developed engine problems with his vehicle.
 Lap 82: Ralph Earnhardt takes over the lead from Junior Johnson.
 Lap 89: Pete Yow suddenly had a faulty transmission in his racing vehicle.
 Lap 97: Speedy Thompson takes over the lead from Ralph Earnhardt.
 Lap 105: Bobby Myers' radiator went haywire, forcing him out of the race.
 Lap 126: Jack Smith's vehicle developed the same problem as Bobby Myers back on lap 105.
 Lap 179: Bobby Keck had to leave the race due to a problem with his vehicle's bearings.
 Lap 210: Junior Johnson's vapor lock developed issues, forcing him to exit the event.
 Lap 232: The right rear axle of Lee Petty's vehicle became problematic, causing him to leave the race.
 Finish: Speedy Thompson was officially declared the winner of the event.

References

Buddy Shuman 250
Buddy Shuman 250
Buddy Shuman 250
NASCAR races at Hickory Motor Speedway